Thabet El-Batal (16 September 1953 – 14 February 2005) was an Egyptian international goalkeeper.

He played club football in his homeland (El Hawamdia). Then he went to Al Ahly between 1972 and 1991. He is considered to be one the greatest goalkeepers in africa. His name "El-Batal" is the name of his family

Career 
The career of Thabet El-Batal evolved from the team in his neighborhood, Al Hawmdia. He then made the acquaintance of Hawamdeh (Abdo El-Bakal) who convinced him at age 19 to sign with Al Ahly in 1972.

He joined the club in Cairo during the 1972/1973 season and played some friendly matches with a match against Ittihad, where he stopped a penalty kick, to let Al Ahly win the match 1–0.

El-Batal became the Al Ahly guard, formally beginning with the 1974/1975 season and succeeded in winning his championship year for the first time after successive victories and titles, both continental and Egyptian. He was one of the major players in the emergence of the club in Africa.

He spent a total of 17 seasons at the club and retired at the end of the 1990/1991 season, after the match against Aswan in the Egypt Cup final, where they won 1–0.

Internationally, he made his first appearance as a team to Egypt in 1974 and spent 16 years. He won the African Nations Cup in 1986 and participated in the Olympic Games. He was a member of the Egypt squad which participated in the 1990 FIFA World Cup in Italy.

In 2004, he then became the technical director of Al Ahly. He succeeded by his office in achieving many of the championships, 5 of them in successive league championships, the Egypt Cup once and twice the championship of the Arab Clubs Champions and Super Cup twice.

Thabet El-Batal died in February 2005, after a long battle with cancer.

Honours

Club
Al Ahly
 Egyptian Premier League: 1974–75, 1975–76, 1976–77, 1978–79, 1979–80, 1980–81, 1981–82, 1984–85, 1985–86, 1986–87, 1988-1989
 Egypt Cup: 1978, 1981, 1983, 1984, 1985, 1989, 1991
 African Cup of Champions Clubs: 1982, 1987
 African Cup Winners' Cup: 1984, 1985, 1986
 Afro-Asian Cup: 1988

International
Egypt 
 African Cup of Nations: 1986

References

1953 births
2005 deaths
1990 FIFA World Cup players
1974 African Cup of Nations players
1984 African Cup of Nations players
1986 African Cup of Nations players
1990 African Cup of Nations players
Egyptian footballers
Al Ahly SC players
Egypt international footballers
Egyptian Premier League players
Competitors at the 1979 Mediterranean Games
Africa Cup of Nations-winning players
Association football goalkeepers
Footballers from Cairo
Deaths from cancer in Egypt
Mediterranean Games competitors for Egypt